ADAS is a UK-based independent agricultural and environmental consultancy and provider of rural development and policy advice.  ADAS provides independent science-based research, consultancy and contracting services to a wide range of organisations in both the private and public sectors, throughout the UK and internationally.

History 

The UK's National Agricultural Advisory Service (NAAS) was established in 1946 as the advisory and research arm of the Ministry of Agriculture, Fisheries and Food (MAFF) due to harsh food rationing of World War II that continued in the UK into the early 1950s. Plant pathology, entomology, soil and other specialist advisers throughout the country advised farmers and growers how to maximise their output.

The NAAS was rebranded as ADAS in 1971. In 1992, ADAS became an Executive Agency of MAFF until the business was privatised in 1997. A collection of drainage tiles used in underground water management were donated to The Museum of English Rural Life in 1994.

In 2016 the business, operating assets and employees of ADAS were acquired by environmental consultancy, RSK.

Company Info 

ADAS operates from 16 principal sites throughout the UK. The business employs 300 staff on permanent or fixed-term contracts and calls on a further 250 on contingent terms.

ADAS has a large number of customers in the UK and abroad. These range from small rural enterprises to major corporations, government departments, and agencies. 

In 2022, ADAS provided two research reports to inform advice to the government for its climate change risk assessment. They also undertook work on reducing emissions from agricultural supply chains and in early 2023 are working with twenty model farms to find the extent to which common carbon calculators diverge in their estimates of carbon footprints in a Defra-funded project.

Farmer's Voice is an annual farming survey (held up till 2006 at least)

References 

https://www.fwi.co.uk/business/business-management/agricultural-transition/4-popular-carbon-calculators-for-farms-compared

External links 
 

Companies based in Wolverhampton
British companies established in 1946
Privatised executive agencies of the United Kingdom government
1946 establishments in England
Consulting firms established in 1946
Agriculture companies established in 1946